Aplocheilus werneri (Werner's killifish) is a species of killifish endemic to Sri Lanka. Its natural habitats are small, shallow, slow-flowing, heavily shaded streams and rivulets with a silt or clay substrate. They are largely use as an aquarium fish. The specific name honours the fish importer Andreas Werner who imported this species into Germany for the first time in 1964.

References

werneri
Tropical fish
Freshwater fish of Sri Lanka
Taxa named by Herman Meinken
Fish described in 1966